Pinanga tashiroi is a species of palm tree in the family Arecaceae. It is a critically endangered species.

Distribution
Pinanga tashiroi is found only on Orchid Island (Lan Yu) off the southeastern coast of Taiwan ; it is thus endemic to Taiwan.

Its natural habitat is lowland rain forest below .

References

tashiroi
Endemic flora of Taiwan
Trees of Taiwan
Critically endangered flora of Asia
Taxonomy articles created by Polbot